Downtown Huntington Historic District is a national historic district located at Huntington, Cabell County, West Virginia. The original district encompassed 59 contributing buildings; the boundary increase added 53 more contributing buildings.  It includes the central business district of Huntington, and includes several of its municipal and governmental buildings. It contains the majority of the historic concentration of downtown commercial buildings.  Notable buildings include the Huntington City Hall, Johnson Memorial Church (c.1886/1912/1935), Trinity Episcopal Church (1882), Davis Opera House (c. 1885), Love Hardware Building (c. 1884), Reuschleins Jewelry building (1923), the Newcomb Building (c. 1902), the Morrison Building (1919), Keith-Albee Theater (1928), West Virginia Building (c. 1924), and Gideon Building (c. 1915).  Located in the district are the separately listed Carnegie Public Library, Cabell County Courthouse, U.S. Post Office and Court House, and Campbell-Hicks House.

It was listed on the National Register of Historic Places in 1986.  A boundary increase occurred in 2007.

References

National Register of Historic Places in Cabell County, West Virginia
Historic districts in Cabell County, West Virginia
Buildings and structures in Huntington, West Virginia
Gothic Revival architecture in West Virginia
Victorian architecture in West Virginia
Art Deco architecture in West Virginia
Commercial buildings on the National Register of Historic Places in West Virginia
Historic districts on the National Register of Historic Places in West Virginia